The following is a chronological list of political catchphrases throughout the history of the United States government. This is not necessarily a list of historical quotes, but phrases that have been commonly referenced or repeated within various political contexts.

19th-century
"We are all Republicans – we are all Federalists", Thomas Jefferson's First Inaugural Address in 1801.
"Liberty and Union, now and for ever, one and inseparable!", a famous excerpt from the "Second Reply to Hayne" speech given by Senator Daniel Webster during the Nullification Crisis. The full speech is generally regarded as the most eloquent ever delivered in Congress. The slogan itself would later become the state motto for North Dakota.
"Our Federal Union. It must be preserved", toast famously made by Andrew Jackson during a formal gala commemorating Thomas Jefferson's birthday on April 13, 1830. The toast refers to the secessionist dispute that began during the Nullification Crisis and it became a slogan against nullification in the ensuing political affair.
"Tippecanoe and Tyler too", popular slogan for Whig Party candidates William Henry Harrison and John Tyler in the 1840 U.S. presidential election.
"Show me the spot", Abraham Lincoln challenging the alleged incident of invasion by Mexico and loss of life, called the Thornton Affair, that precipitated the Mexican–American War.
"A house divided against itself cannot stand.", opening lines of Abraham Lincoln's famous 1858 "A House Divided" speech, addressing the division between slave states and free states in the United States at the time.
"Four score and seven years ago...", opening of Abraham Lincoln's Gettysburg Address.
"... government of the people, by the people, for the people, shall not perish from the earth", ending of Abraham Lincoln's Gettysburg Address.
"Don't swap horses in the middle of the stream." - slogan of Abraham Lincoln and the National Union Party during the 1864 presidential election, arguing in favor of retaining Lincoln as president during the American Civil War. The slogan has since been adopted by various incumbents during times of crisis, most famously by Franklin D. Roosevelt in the 1944 presidential election during World War II and by George W. Bush in the 2004 presidential election during the War on Terror.
"Go West, young man, and grow up with the country", a phrase often attributed to author and newspaper editor Horace Greeley in favor of westward expansion.
"I will not accept if nominated and will not serve if elected," said by William Tecumseh Sherman when asked about a presidential bid during the 1884 presidential election. Repeated and paraphrased by various politicians and public figures in later years, including Lyndon B. Johnson in 1968, Dwight D. Eisenhower in the 1940s, Dick Cheney in 2008, and Stephen King in reference to the 2018 Maine gubernatorial election.
"You shall not press down upon the brow of labor this crown of thorns. You shall not crucify mankind upon a cross of gold." William Jennings Bryan in 1896, expressing his opposition to the gold standard.

20th-century

1900s–1950s
"Speak softly, and carry a big stick", Theodore Roosevelt's corollary to the Monroe Doctrine.
"Smoke-filled room", used to describe the backroom at the Blackstone Hotel where senators gathered to secure Warren G. Harding's nomination during the 1920 Republican National Convention. The term now means a place behind the scenes, where cigar-smoking party bosses make political decisions.
"The only thing we have to fear is fear itself.", from Franklin D. Roosevelt's first inaugural address.
"Yesterday, December 7, 1941, a date which will live in infamy." said by President Franklin D. Roosevelt after the Japanese attack on Pearl Harbor.
"I shall return." U.S. General Douglas MacArthur after leaving the Philippines.
 "Is there anything we can do for you? For you are the one in trouble now." Eleanor Roosevelt to Harry Truman, upon learning Franklin Roosevelt had died.
 "The buck stops here", paperweight on the desk of Harry Truman.
"I like Ike", campaign slogan for President Dwight D. Eisenhower.
The wrong war, at the wrong place, at the wrong time, and with the wrong enemy - said by Chairman of the Joint Chiefs of Staff General Omar Bradley to the U.S. Senate in opposition to extending the Korean War into China. Contributed to President Harry S. Truman's dismissal of the commander of U.N. forces Douglas MacArthur. Later utilized in variations in opposition to the Vietnam War and the Iraq War. 
"Clean as a hound's tooth", the standard promised by Republican candidate Dwight D. Eisenhower in the 1952 campaign, which gained attention when Richard Nixon, campaigning for vice president on the same ticket was accused of using campaign funds for personal use.
"And you know, the kids, like all kids, love the dog and I just want to say this right now, that regardless of what they say about it, we're gonna keep it." – famous line from the Checkers speech delivered by Richard Nixon.
"Are you now or have you ever been a member of the Communist Party?" infamous question asked by the House Un-American Activities Committee during the height of the Cold War.
"Have you no sense of decency, sir? At long last, have you left no sense of decency?", Joseph N. Welch confronts Senator Joseph McCarthy during the televised Army–McCarthy hearings on June 9, 1954.

1960s–1970s
"Ask not what your country can do for you—ask what you can do for your country", part of the Inaugural address of John F. Kennedy.
"You won't have Nixon to kick around anymore," said by Richard Nixon in 1962 when he announced his retirement from politics after losing the 1962 California gubernatorial election.
"Ich bin ein Berliner", said by John F. Kennedy in West Berlin.
“In the name of the greatest people that have ever trod this earth, I draw the line in the dust and toss the gauntlet before the feet of tyranny, and I say segregation now, segregation tomorrow, segregation forever.” — Said by Alabama Governor George Wallace during his 1963 inaugural address in Montgomery, defending the institution of segregation in the southern United States and characterizing the federal government's civil rights initiatives as authoritarian. Wallace emerged afterwards as one of the strongest defenders of segregation in the South during the 1960s. 
"I know it when I see it", used by Supreme Court Justice Potter Stewart to describe his threshold test for obscenity in Jacobellis v. Ohio (1964).
"I would remind you that extremism in the defense of liberty is no vice. And let me remind you also that moderation in the pursuit of justice is no virtue." Said by Barry Goldwater in his acceptance speech at the 1964 Republican National Convention.
"Hey, hey, LBJ, how many kids did you kill today?" slogan of anti-war protests during the Vietnam War
"America, love it or leave it," slogan of pro-war protests during the Vietnam War
"Let me say this about that", frequently said by President Richard Nixon.
"Let me make one thing perfectly clear", frequently said by President Richard Nixon.
"Only Nixon could go to China", saying that became popular in the wake of Richard Nixon's visit to the People's Republic of China.
"What did the President know and when did he know it?", asked by Senator Howard Baker in the Senate Watergate hearings.
"I'm not a crook", said by Richard Nixon in reference to his never having profited through his government service. (Often misquoted as "I am not a crook.")
"Follow the money", popularized by All The President's Men, used in several contexts.
"I'm a Ford, not a Lincoln", said by Gerald Ford in his first speech as president.
"Whip inflation now", Gerald Ford's widely ridiculed speech to Congress October 8, 1974.
"When the president does it, that means that it is not illegal." Said by Richard Nixon during the Frost/Nixon interviews, about his alleged participation in the Watergate scandal cover-up.

1980s

"Voodoo Economics", a term used by George H. W. Bush in reference to President Ronald Reagan's economic policies, which came to be known as "Reaganomics," during the 1980 Republican Party presidential primaries. Before President Bush became Reagan's vice president, he viewed his eventual running mate's economic policies with great skepticism. Reagan was a proponent of supply-side economics, favoring reduced income and capital gains tax rates, which supporters claim actually increase government revenue over time. It was the last point that Bush initially took objection to.
"There you go again", said by Ronald Reagan about Jimmy Carter during their 1980 presidential debate and was used by Reagan again about Walter Mondale in their 1984 Presidential debate. This quotation was also borrowed by Sarah Palin during the 2008 Vice Presidential Debate against Joe Biden.
"Let's make America great again!" Slogan from the Reagan campaign in 1980, also used in 1992 by Bill Clinton and in 2016 by Donald Trump.
"Are you better off now than you were four years ago?", a question posed by Ronald Reagan at the end of his debate with Jimmy Carter in 1980. Often invoked by future presidential candidates. 
"I'm from the government, and I'm here to help", said by Ronald Reagan referring to the "most terrifying words in the English language" in opposition to welfare policies.
"In this present crisis, government is not the solution to our problems; government is the problem", said by Ronald Reagan.
"I will not exploit, for political purposes, my opponent's youth and inexperience", said by Ronald Reagan in the second debate with Walter Mondale, defusing the age issue.
"It's morning again in America": Ronald Reagan, in reference to the recovering economy and the dominating performance by the U.S. athletes at the Los Angeles Olympics that summer, among other things.
"Where's the beef?", said by presidential hopeful and former Democratic Vice President Walter Mondale, when attacking Colorado Senator Gary Hart in a 1984 Democratic primary debate. Mondale meant that Hart was only doing lip service. The phrase was derived from a popular television ad for Wendy's hamburgers.
"Trust, but verify", used by Ronald Reagan when discussing relations with the Soviet Union. Originally a Russian proverb.
"Mistakes were made", said by Ronald Reagan in the 1987 State of the Union Address in reference to the Iran-Contra affair. Repeated by many others, including Bill Clinton and George W. Bush.
"Mr. Gorbachev, tear down this wall!", said by Ronald Reagan while speaking in West Berlin calling on the Soviet Union to dismantle the Berlin Wall separating West Berlin from East Germany.
"Oh, the vision thing", said by George H. W. Bush, responding to concerns that his campaign lacked a unifying theme.
"Read my lips: no new taxes", said by George H. W. Bush during the 1988 U.S. presidential election. Bush would famously agree to a tax increase as part of a deficit-reduction deal during his actual presidency.
Thousand points of light, first used by George H. W. Bush in his speech accepting the presidential nomination at the 1988 Republican National Convention.
"Senator, you're no Jack Kennedy", said by Senator Lloyd Bentsen to Senator Dan Quayle in the 1988 Vice Presidential debate. Sometimes misquoted as "you, sir, are no Jack Kennedy."

1990s

"Vote for the crook. It's important." A bumper sticker slogan created by Morton Blackwell urging people to vote for Edwin Edwards over noted white supremacist David Duke in the 1991 Louisiana gubernatorial election.
"I'm Ross, and you're the Boss", said by Ross Perot during the 1992 presidential election.
"That giant sucking sound", said by Ross Perot in 1992 with regards to American jobs going to Mexico if the North American Free Trade Agreement (NAFTA) were ratified.
"I didn't inhale", said by Bill Clinton regarding experimenting with marijuana while attending Oxford University.
"It's the economy, stupid" was a phrase in American politics widely used during Bill Clinton's successful 1992 presidential campaign against George H. W. Bush. Widely attributed to Clinton advisor James Carville.  The phrase, although now almost always quoted in its current form, is actually an incorrect quotation: Carville's original slogan, which he first wrote as part of a poster displayed in candidate Clinton's campaign headquarters, was "The Economy, Stupid", with no "It's".
"I did not have sexual relations with that woman", said by Bill Clinton regarding Monica Lewinsky.
"Vast right-wing conspiracy", used by Hillary Clinton in 1998 in defense of husband President Bill Clinton in reference to the Lewinsky scandal.
"It depends upon what the meaning of the word 'is' is." Said by Bill Clinton during testimony regarding his relationship with Monica Lewinsky.
"During my service in the United States Congress, I took the initiative in creating the Internet." said by Al Gore during a 1999 CNN interview, and often interpreted as "I invented the Internet."

21st-century

2000s

 "Fuzzy math", first used by George W. Bush and used often by others since.
 "Axis of evil", first used by Bush in his 2002 State of the Union Address, referring to North Korea, Iran, and Ba'athist Iraq.
 "There are unknown unknowns", used by Donald Rumsfeld when discussing the invasion of Iraq.
 "Reality-based community", attributed to a Bush administration official, widely believed to be Karl Rove.
 "Yes we can", used by Barack Obama as a slogan during the 2008 presidential campaign. Two years earlier, Obama's friend Deval Patrick had used the similar "Together We Can" in a successful campaign to become Governor of Massachusetts.

2010s
"The rent is too damn high", the catchphrase of Jimmy McMillan, a perennial candidate and founder of the Rent Is Too Damn High Party.
"You didn't build that", used by Barack Obama referring to federal infrastructure. The phrase was used by his opponents to suggest that Obama meant there is no individual success in the United States.
 War on Women, a slogan used by the Democratic Party in attacks from 2010 onward.
 "Binders full of women", a phrase used by Mitt Romney in the 2012 presidential debates. Though intended as a supportive comment about resolving the gender pay gap through alternative hiring practices, it had the opposite effect among many voters and was frequently ridiculed.
"Make America Great Again", a campaign slogan used by Donald Trump; it was previously used by Ronald Reagan in 1980.
"I like people who weren't captured", a phrase used by Donald Trump in reference to Sen. John McCain of Arizona at the Family Leadership Summit in Iowa.
"Basket of deplorables", a phrase used by Hillary Clinton to describe some of Donald Trump's supporters. The phrase was embraced by many Trump supporters.
"But her emails", a phrase used primarily by critics of Donald Trump to mock the abundance of attention paid to Hillary Clinton's email controversy during the 2016 election. Clinton later began selling merchandise featuring the phrase.
"Drain the Swamp", used by many politicians, including Ronald Reagan, Nancy Pelosi, and Donald Trump.
 "Such a nasty woman", said by Donald Trump during the final presidential debate between him and Hillary Clinton. The phrase was embraced by some women voters and has also launched a feminist movement by the same name.
 "Alternative facts", a phrase used by U.S. Counselor to the President Kellyanne Conway during a Meet the Press interview in January 2017, in which she defended White House Press Secretary Sean Spicer's false statement about the attendance at Donald Trump's inauguration as President of the United States.
Fake news, a term used frequently by Donald Trump.
 "Nevertheless, she persisted", used by Senate Majority Leader Mitch McConnell to describe Senator Elizabeth Warren's insistence on reading a letter from Coretta Scott King into the Congressional Record during one of Jeff Sessions's confirmation hearings. The letter outlined opposition to Senator Sessions' confirmation for a federal judgeship in 1980s.
 "Covfefe", an apparent typo used by President Donald Trump in 2017 in a Twitter post which read "Despite the constant negative press covfefe". The phrase became an internet meme, and a bill named the COVFEFE Act, meant to preserve social media posts made by the president, was later introduced in the House of Representatives.
"Believe women", a slogan of the ＃MeToo movement. The phrase was popularized after Justice Brett Kavanaugh's nomination hearings.

2020s
"Will you shut up, man?", used by Joe Biden in the first presidential debate against Donald Trump. It is sometimes quoted as "Would you shut up, man."
"Stop the Steal," coined by Republican political operative Roger Stone in 2016. The phrase resurfaced in 2020 in response to the conspiracy theory that widespread electoral fraud occurred during the 2020 presidential election to deny incumbent Donald Trump victory over Joe Biden.
"Let’s go Brandon," used by detractors of President Joe Biden as a euphemism for "Fuck Joe Biden".

See also
Democrat Party (epithet)
List of U.S. presidential campaign slogans

References

 
United States political catchphrases
United States political catchphrases
 
United States catchphrases